is a weekly series of original net animations released as part of a collaboration between Hideaki Anno's Studio Khara and Dwango, consisting of various anime shorts produced by many directors. The project began release from 7 November 2014 and is streamed worldwide on Niconico. As of December 2018, the website and all materials related to it have been temporarily closed off to the public. They make mention of reuploading this content at a later date under a new domain.

Production
The project was first announced by Hideaki Anno at the Tokyo International Film Festival. The project is designed to offer new animators more exposure to a worldwide audience. The project's logo was designed by Hayao Miyazaki. All characters are voiced by Koichi Yamadera and Megumi Hayashibara.

Shorts

References

External links
Official website 

2014 anime ONAs
Animation anthology series
Gundam anime and manga
Japanese anthology television series
Khara
Graphinica
Sola Digital Arts
Studio Colorido
Studio Trigger
Ultra Series